Terence Murray is an Irish hurling referee.  A native of Patrickswell, County Limerick he was one of the sport's top referees throughout the 1980s and 1990s.  Murray officiated at several All-Ireland finals in minor, under-21 and senior levels. His son, Brian Murray, is the current goalkeeper of the Patrickswell senior team.

References

 Donegan, Des, The Complete Handbook of Gaelic Games (DBA Publications Limited, 2005).

Year of birth missing (living people)
Living people
Hurling referees
Sportspeople from County Limerick